Matthew Paternoster (14 April 1880 – 19 April 1962) was an Australian rules footballer who played with Fitzroy.

He was the brother of Jim Paternoster and they were both recruited from Richmond at the same time but Matthew never made a senior appearance for Richmond.

References

Sources

 

1880 births
1962 deaths
Australian rules footballers from Melbourne
Australian Rules footballers: place kick exponents
Fitzroy Football Club players
People from Berwick, Victoria